The Lockheed SR-71 "Blackbird" is a long-range, high-altitude, Mach 3+ strategic reconnaissance aircraft developed and manufactured by the American aerospace company Lockheed Corporation. It was operated by the United States Air Force (USAF) and NASA.

The SR-71 was developed as a black project from the Lockheed A-12 reconnaissance aircraft during the 1960s by Lockheed's Skunk Works division. American aerospace engineer Clarence "Kelly" Johnson was responsible for many of the aircraft's innovative concepts. The shape of the SR-71 was based on that of the A-12, which was one of the first aircraft to be designed with a reduced radar cross-section. Initially, a bomber variant of the A-12 was requested by Curtis LeMay, before the program was focused solely on reconnaissance. Mission equipment for the reconnaissance role included signals intelligence sensors, side looking airborne radar, and a camera; the SR-71 was both longer and heavier than the A-12, allowing it to hold more fuel as well as a two-seat cockpit. The SR-71 entered service in January 1966.

During aerial reconnaissance missions, the SR-71 operated at high speeds and altitudes (Mach 3.2 and ), allowing it to outrace or entirely avoid threats. If a surface-to-air missile launch was detected, the standard evasive action was simply to accelerate and outpace the missile. On average, each SR-71 could fly once per week due to the extended turnaround required after mission recovery. A total of 32 aircraft were built; 12 were lost in accidents with none lost to enemy action. In 1989, the USAF retired the SR-71 largely for political reasons; several were briefly reactivated during the 1990s before their second retirement in 1998. NASA was the final operator of the Blackbird, who used it as a research platform, retiring it in 1999. Since its retirement, the SR-71's role has been taken up by a combination of reconnaissance satellites and unmanned aerial vehicles (UAVs); a proposed UAV successor, the SR-72, is under development by Lockheed Martin, and scheduled to fly in 2025. The SR-71 has several nicknames, including "Blackbird" and "Habu".  the SR-71 holds the world record it set in 1976 as the fastest air-breathing manned aircraft, previously held by the related Lockheed YF-12.

Development

Background

Lockheed's previous reconnaissance aircraft was the relatively slow U-2, designed for the Central Intelligence Agency (CIA). In late 1957, the CIA approached the defense contractor Lockheed to build an undetectable spy plane. The project, named Archangel, was led by Kelly Johnson, head of Lockheed's Skunk Works unit in Burbank, California. The work on project Archangel began in the second quarter of 1958, with aim of flying higher and faster than the U-2. Of 11 successive designs drafted in a span of 10 months, "A-10" was the front-runner. Despite this, however, its shape made it vulnerable to radar detection. After a meeting with the CIA in March 1959, the design was modified to have a 90% reduction in radar cross-section. The CIA approved a US$96 million contract for Skunk Works to build a dozen spy planes, named "A-12", on 11 February 1960. The 1960 downing of Francis Gary Powers's U-2 underscored the aircraft's vulnerability and the need for faster reconnaissance aircraft such as the A-12.

The A-12 first flew at Groom Lake (Area 51), Nevada, on 25 April 1962. Thirteen were built; two variants were also developed, including three of the YF-12 interceptor prototype, and two of the M-21 drone carrier. The aircraft was meant to be powered by the Pratt & Whitney J58 engine, but development ran over schedule, and it was equipped instead with the less powerful Pratt & Whitney J75 initially. The J58s were retrofitted as they became available, and became the standard engine for all subsequent aircraft in the series (A-12, YF-12, M-21), as well as the SR-71. The A-12 flew missions over Vietnam and North Korea before its retirement in 1968. The program's cancellation was announced on 28 December 1966, due both to budget concerns and because of the forthcoming SR-71, a derivative of the A-12.

Designation as SR-71

The SR-71 designation is a continuation of the pre-1962 bomber series; the last aircraft built using the series was the XB-70 Valkyrie. However, a bomber variant of the Blackbird was briefly given the B-71 designator, which was retained when the type was changed to SR-71.

During the later stages of its testing, the B-70 was proposed for a reconnaissance/strike role, with an "RS-70" designation. When the A-12's performance potential was clearly found to be much greater, the USAF ordered a variant of the A-12 in December 1962, which was originally named R-12 by Lockheed. This USAF version was longer and heavier than the original A-12 because it had a longer fuselage to hold more fuel.  The R-12 also had a larger two-seat cockpit, and reshaped fuselage chines. Reconnaissance equipment included signals intelligence sensors, a side-looking airborne radar, and a photo camera. The CIA's A-12 was a better photo-reconnaissance platform than the USAF's R-12, since the A-12 flew somewhat higher and faster, and with only one pilot, it had room to carry a superior camera and more instruments. The A-12 flew covert missions while the SR-71 flew overt missions; the latter had USAF markings and pilots carried Geneva Conventions Identification Cards.

During the 1964 campaign, Republican presidential nominee Barry Goldwater repeatedly criticized President Lyndon B. Johnson and his administration for falling behind the Soviet Union in developing new weapons. Johnson decided to counter this criticism by revealing the existence of the YF-12A USAF interceptor, which also served as cover for the still-secret A-12 and the USAF reconnaissance model since July 1964. USAF Chief of Staff General Curtis LeMay preferred the SR (Strategic Reconnaissance) designation and wanted the RS-71 to be named SR-71. Before the July speech, LeMay lobbied to modify Johnson's speech to read "SR-71" instead of "RS-71". The media transcript given to the press at the time still had the earlier RS-71 designation in places, creating the story that the president had misread the aircraft's designation. To conceal the A-12's existence, Johnson referred only to the A-11, while revealing the existence of a high speed, high altitude reconnaissance aircraft.

In 1968, Secretary of Defense Robert McNamara canceled the F-12 interceptor program. The specialized tooling used to manufacture both the YF-12 and the SR-71 was also ordered destroyed. Production of the SR-71 totaled 32 aircraft with 29 SR-71As, two SR-71Bs, and the single SR-71C.

Design

Overview

The SR-71 was designed for flight at over Mach 3 with a flight crew of two in tandem cockpits, with the pilot in the forward cockpit and the reconnaissance systems officer operating the surveillance systems and equipment from the rear cockpit, and directing navigation on the mission flight path. The SR-71 was designed to minimize its radar cross-section, an early attempt at stealth design. Finished aircraft were painted a dark blue, almost black, to increase the emission of internal heat and to act as camouflage against the night sky. The dark color led to the aircraft's nickname "Blackbird".

While the SR-71 carried radar countermeasures to evade interception efforts, its greatest protection was its combination of high altitude and very high speed, which made it almost invulnerable. Along with its low radar cross-section, these qualities gave a very short time for an enemy surface-to-air missile (SAM) site to acquire and track the aircraft on radar. By the time the SAM site could track the SR-71, it was often too late to launch a SAM, and the SR-71 would be out of range before the SAM could catch up to it. If the SAM site could track the SR-71 and fire a SAM in time, the SAM would expend nearly all of the delta-v of its boost and sustainer phases just reaching the SR-71's altitude; at this point, out of thrust, it could do little more than follow its ballistic arc. Merely accelerating would typically be enough for an SR-71 to evade a SAM; changes by the pilots in the SR-71's speed, altitude, and heading were also often enough to spoil any radar lock on the plane by SAM sites or enemy fighters. At sustained speeds of more than Mach 3.2, the plane was faster than the Soviet Union's fastest interceptor, the Mikoyan-Gurevich MiG-25, which also could not reach the SR-71's altitude. During its service life, no SR-71 was ever shot down.

Airframe, canopy, and landing gear
On most aircraft, the use of titanium was limited by the costs involved; it was generally used only in components exposed to the highest temperatures, such as exhaust fairings and the leading edges of wings.  On the SR-71, titanium was used for 85% of the structure, with much of the rest polymer composite materials. To control costs, Lockheed used a more easily worked titanium alloy which softened at a lower temperature. The challenges posed led Lockheed to develop new fabrication methods, which have since been used in the manufacture of other aircraft. Lockheed found that washing welded titanium requires distilled water, as the chlorine present in tap water is corrosive; cadmium-plated tools could not be used, as they also caused corrosion. Metallurgical contamination was another problem; at one point, 80% of the delivered titanium for manufacture was rejected on these grounds.

The high temperatures generated in flight required special design and operating techniques. Major sections of the skin of the inboard wings were corrugated, not smooth. Aerodynamicists initially opposed the concept, disparagingly referring to the aircraft as a Mach 3 variant of the 1920s-era Ford Trimotor, which was known for its corrugated aluminum skin. The heat would have caused a smooth skin to split or curl, whereas the corrugated skin could expand vertically and horizontally and had increased longitudinal strength.

Fuselage panels were manufactured to fit only loosely with the aircraft on the ground. Proper alignment was achieved as the airframe heated up, with thermal expansion of several inches. Because of this, and the lack of a fuel-sealing system that could handle the airframe's expansion at extreme temperatures, the aircraft leaked JP-7 fuel on the ground prior to takeoff, annoying ground crews.

The outer windscreen of the cockpit was made of quartz and was fused ultrasonically to the titanium frame. The temperature of the exterior of the windscreen reached  during a mission. Cooling was carried out by cycling fuel behind the titanium surfaces in the chines.

Some SR-71s featured red stripes to prevent maintenance workers from damaging the thin, fragile skin located near the center of the fuselage. This portion of the skin was only supported by widely spaced structural ribs.

The Blackbird's tires, manufactured by B.F. Goodrich, contained aluminum and were filled with nitrogen. They cost $2,300 and would generally require replacing within 20 missions.

Acquisition of titanium 
Titanium was in short supply in the United States, so the Skunk Works team was forced to look elsewhere for the metal. Much of the needed material came from the Soviet Union. Colonel Rich Graham, SR-71 pilot, described the acquisition process:
The airplane is 92% titanium inside and out. Back when they were building the airplane the United States didn't have the ore supplies – an ore called rutile ore. It's a very sandy soil and it's only found in very few parts of the world. The major supplier of the ore was the USSR. Working through Third World countries and bogus operations, they were able to get the rutile ore shipped to the United States to build the SR-71.

Shape and threat avoidance

The second operational aircraft designed around a stealth aircraft shape and materials, after the Lockheed A-12, the SR-71 had several features designed to reduce its radar signature. Drawing on early studies in radar stealth technology, which indicated that a shape with flattened, tapering sides would reflect most energy away from a radar beam's place of origin, engineers added chines and canted the vertical control surfaces inward. Special radar-absorbing materials were incorporated into sawtooth-shaped sections of the aircraft's skin. Cesium-based fuel additives were used to somewhat reduce exhaust plumes' visibility to radar, although exhaust streams remained quite apparent. Kelly Johnson later conceded that Soviet radar technology advanced faster than the stealth technology employed against it.

The SR-71 featured chines, a pair of sharp edges leading aft from either side of the nose along the fuselage. These were not a feature on the early A-3 design; Frank Rodgers, a doctor at the Scientific Engineering Institute, a CIA front organization, discovered that a cross-section of a sphere had a greatly reduced radar reflection, and adapted a cylindrical-shaped fuselage by stretching out the sides of the fuselage. After the advisory panel provisionally selected Convair's FISH design over the A-3 on the basis of RCS, Lockheed adopted chines for its A-4 through A-6 designs.

Aerodynamicists discovered that the chines generated powerful vortices and created additional lift, leading to unexpected aerodynamic performance improvements. The angle of incidence of the delta wings could be reduced for greater stability and less drag at high speeds, and more weight carried, such as fuel. Landing speeds were also reduced, as the chines' vortices created turbulent flow over the wings at high angles of attack, making it harder to stall. The chines also acted like leading-edge extensions, which increase the agility of fighters such as the F-5, F-16, F/A-18, MiG-29, and Su-27. The addition of chines also allowed the removal of the planned canard foreplanes.

Air inlets

The air inlets allowed the SR-71 to cruise at over Mach 3.2, with the air slowing down to subsonic speed as it entered the engine. Mach 3.2 was the design point for the aircraft, its most efficient speed. However, in practice the SR-71 was sometimes more efficient at even faster speeds—depending on the outside air temperature—as measured by pounds of fuel burned per nautical mile traveled. During one mission, SR-71 pilot Brian Shul flew faster than usual to avoid multiple interception attempts; afterward, it was discovered that this had reduced fuel consumption.

At the front of each inlet, a pointed, movable inlet cone called a "spike" was locked in its full forward position on the ground and during subsonic flight. When the aircraft accelerated past Mach 1.6, an internal jackscrew moved the spike up to  inwards, directed by an analog air inlet computer that took into account pitot-static system, pitch, roll, yaw, and angle of attack. Moving the spike tip drew the shock wave riding on it closer to the inlet cowling until it touched just slightly inside the cowling lip. This position reflected the spike shock wave repeatedly between the spike center body and the inlet inner cowl sides, and minimized airflow spillage which is the cause of spillage drag. The air slowed supersonically with a final plane shock wave at entry to the subsonic diffuser.

Downstream of this normal shock, the air is subsonic. It decelerates further in the divergent duct to give the required speed at entry to the compressor. Capture of the plane's shock wave within the inlet is called "starting the inlet". Bleed tubes and bypass doors were designed into the inlet and engine nacelles to handle some of this pressure and to position the final shock to allow the inlet to remain "started".

In the early years of operation, the analog computers would not always keep up with rapidly changing flight environmental inputs. If internal pressures became too great and the spike was incorrectly positioned, the shock wave would suddenly blow out the front of the inlet, called an "inlet unstart". During unstarts, afterburner extinctions were common. The remaining engine's asymmetrical thrust would cause the aircraft to yaw violently to one side. SAS, autopilot, and manual control inputs would fight the yawing, but often the extreme off-angle would reduce airflow in the opposite engine and stimulate "sympathetic stalls". This generated a rapid counter-yawing, often coupled with loud "banging" noises, and a rough ride during which crews' helmets would sometimes strike their cockpit canopies. One response to a single unstart was unstarting both inlets to prevent yawing, then restarting them both. After wind tunnel testing and computer modeling by NASA Dryden test center, Lockheed installed an electronic control to detect unstart conditions and perform this reset action without pilot intervention. During troubleshooting of the unstart issue, NASA also discovered the vortices from the nose chines were entering the engine and interfering with engine efficiency. NASA developed a computer to control the engine bypass doors which countered this issue and improved efficiency. Beginning in 1980, the analog inlet control system was replaced by a digital system, which reduced unstart instances.

Engines

The SR-71 was powered by two Pratt & Whitney J58 (company designation JT11D-20) axial-flow turbojet engines. The engine was most efficient around Mach 3.2, the Blackbird's typical cruising speed. At take-off, the afterburner provided 26% of the thrust. This proportion increased progressively with speed until the afterburner provided all the thrust at about Mach 3.

Air was initially compressed (and heated) by the inlet spike and subsequent converging duct between the center body and inlet cowl. The shock waves generated slowed the air to subsonic speeds relative to the engine. The air then entered the engine compressor. Some of this compressor flow (20% at cruise) was removed after the fourth compressor stage and went straight to the afterburner through six bypass tubes. Air passing through the turbojet was compressed further by the remaining five compressor stages and then fuel was added in the combustion chamber. After passing through the turbine, the exhaust, together with the compressor bleed air, entered the afterburner.

At around Mach 3, the temperature rise from the intake compression, added to the engine compressor temperature rise, reduced the allowable fuel flow because the turbine temperature limit did not change. The rotating machinery produced less power, but still enough to run at 100% RPM, thus keeping the airflow through the intake constant. The rotating machinery had become a drag item and the engine thrust at high speeds came from the afterburner temperature rise. Maximum flight speed was limited by the temperature of the air entering the engine compressor, which was not certified for temperatures above .

Originally, the Blackbird's J58 engines were started with the assistance of two Buick Wildcat V8 internal combustion engines, externally mounted on a vehicle referred to as an AG330 "start cart". The start cart was positioned underneath the J58 and the two Buick engines powered a single, vertical drive shaft connecting to the J58 engine and spinning it to above 3,200 RPM, at which point the turbojet could self-sustain. Once the first J58 engine was started, the cart was repositioned to start the aircraft's other J58 engine. Later start carts used Chevrolet big-block V8 engines. Eventually, a quieter, pneumatic start system was developed for use at main operating bases. The V8 start carts remained at diversion landing sites not equipped with the pneumatic system.

Fuel

Several exotic fuels were investigated for the Blackbird. Development began on a coal slurry power plant, but Johnson determined that the coal particles damaged important engine components. Research was conducted on a liquid hydrogen powerplant, but the tanks for storing cryogenic hydrogen were not of a suitable size or shape. In practice, the Blackbird would burn somewhat conventional JP-7, which was difficult to ignite. To start the engines, triethylborane (TEB), which ignites on contact with air, was injected to produce temperatures high enough to ignite the JP-7. The TEB produced a characteristic green flame, which could often be seen during engine ignition.

On a typical mission, the SR-71 took off with only a partial fuel load to reduce stress on the brakes and tires during takeoff and also ensure it could successfully take off should one engine fail. Within 20 seconds the aircraft traveled , reached , and lifted off. It reached  of altitude in less than two minutes, and the typical  cruising altitude in another 17 minutes, having used one third of its fuel. It is a common misconception that the planes refueled shortly after takeoff because the jet fuel leaked. The leaking of fuel was an intentional design feature because the high heat generated by the aircraft made it impossible to fully seal the fuselage tanks against leaks. However, the amount of fuel that leaked was not enough to make the refueling necessary; the planes refueled because the maximum speeds of the aircraft were only possible with aerial refueling. 

The SR-71 also required in-flight refueling to replenish fuel during long-duration missions. Supersonic flights generally lasted no more than 90 minutes before the pilot had to find a tanker.

Specialized KC-135Q tankers were required to refuel the SR-71. The KC-135Q had a modified high-speed boom, which would allow refueling of the Blackbird at nearly the tanker's maximum airspeed with minimum flutter. The tanker also had special fuel systems for moving JP-4 (for the KC-135Q itself) and JP-7 (for the SR-71) between different tanks. As an aid to the pilot when refueling, the cockpit was fitted with a peripheral vision horizon display. This unusual instrument projected a barely visible artificial horizon line across the top of the entire instrument panel, which gave the pilot subliminal cues on aircraft attitude.

Astro-inertial navigation system
Nortronics, Northrop Corporation's electronics development division, had developed an astro-inertial guidance system (ANS), which could correct inertial navigation system errors with celestial observations, for the SM-62 Snark missile, and a separate system for the ill-fated AGM-48 Skybolt missile, the latter of which was adapted for the SR-71.

Before takeoff, a primary alignment brought the ANS's inertial components to a high degree of accuracy. In flight, the ANS, which sat behind the reconnaissance systems officer's (RSO's), position, tracked stars through a circular quartz glass window on the upper fuselage. Its "blue light" source star tracker, which could see stars during both day and night, would continuously track a variety of stars as the aircraft's changing position brought them into view. The system's digital computer ephemeris contained data on a list of stars used for celestial navigation: the list first included 56 stars and was later expanded to 61. The ANS could supply altitude and position to flight controls and other systems, including the mission data recorder, automatic navigation to preset destination points, automatic pointing and control of cameras and sensors, and optical or SLR sighting of fixed points loaded into the ANS before takeoff.

Sensors and payloads

The SR-71 originally included optical/infrared imagery systems; side-looking airborne radar (SLAR); electronic intelligence (ELINT) gathering systems; defensive systems for countering missile and airborne fighters; and recorders for SLAR, ELINT, and maintenance data. The SR-71 carried a Fairchild tracking camera and an infrared camera, both of which ran during the entire mission.

As the SR-71 had a second cockpit behind the pilot for the RSO, it could not carry the A-12's principal sensor, a single large-focal-length optical camera that sat in the "Q-Bay" behind the A-12's single cockpit. Instead, the SR-71's camera systems could be located either in the fuselage chines or the removable nose/chine section. Wide-area imaging was provided by two of Itek's Operational Objective Cameras, which provided stereo imagery across the width of the flight track, or an Itek Optical Bar Camera, which gave continuous horizon-to-horizon coverage. A closer view of the target area was given by the HYCON Technical Objective Camera (TEOC), which could be directed up to 45° left or right of the centerline. Initially, the TEOCs could not match the resolution of the A-12's larger camera, but rapid improvements in both the camera and film improved this performance.

SLAR, built by Goodyear Aerospace, could be carried in the removable nose. In later life, the radar was replaced by Loral's Advanced Synthetic Aperture Radar System (ASARS-1). Both the first SLAR and ASARS-1 were ground-mapping imaging systems, collecting data either in fixed swaths left or right of centerline or from a spot location for higher resolution. ELINT-gathering systems, called the Electro Magnetic Reconnaissance System, built by AIL could be carried in the chine bays to analyze electronic signal fields being passed through, and were programmed to identify items of interest.

Over its operational life, the Blackbird carried various electronic countermeasures (ECMs), including warning and active electronic systems built by several ECM companies and called Systems A, A2, A2C, B, C, C2, E, G, H, and M. On a given mission, an aircraft carried several of these frequency/purpose payloads to meet the expected threats. Major Jerry Crew, an RSO, told Air & Space/Smithsonian that he used a jammer to try to confuse surface-to-air missile sites as their crews tracked his airplane, but once his threat-warning receiver told him a missile had been launched, he switched off the jammer to prevent the missile from homing in on its signal. After landing, information from the SLAR, ELINT gathering systems, and the maintenance data recorder were subjected to postflight ground analysis.

Life support

Flying at  meant that crews could not use standard masks, which could not provide enough oxygen above . Specialized protective pressurized suits were produced for crew members by the David Clark Company for the A-12, YF-12, M-21 and SR-71.

The cockpit could be pressurized to an altitude of  during flight. An air conditioner used a heat exchanger to dump heat from the cockpit into the fuel prior to combustion. The same air-conditioning system was also used to keep the front (nose) landing gear bay cool, thereby eliminating the need for the special aluminum-impregnated tires similar to those used on the main landing gear.

Blackbird pilots and RSOs were provided with food and drink for the long reconnaissance flights. Water bottles had long straws which crewmembers guided into an opening in the helmet by looking in a mirror. Food was contained in sealed containers similar to toothpaste tubes which delivered food to the crewmember's mouth through the helmet opening.

Operational history

Main era
The first flight of an SR-71 took place on 22 December 1964, at USAF Plant 42 in Palmdale, California, piloted by Bob Gilliland. The SR-71 reached a top speed of Mach 3.4 during flight testing, with pilot Major Brian Shul reporting a speed in excess of Mach 3.5 on an operational sortie while evading a missile over Libya. The first SR-71 to enter service was delivered to the 4200th (later, 9th) Strategic Reconnaissance Wing at Beale Air Force Base, California, in January 1966.

SR-71s first arrived at the 9th SRW's Operating Location (OL-8) at Kadena Air Base, Okinawa, Japan on 8 March 1968. These deployments were code-named "Glowing Heat", while the program as a whole was code-named "Senior Crown". Reconnaissance missions over North Vietnam were code-named "Black Shield" and then renamed "Giant Scale" in late 1968. On 21 March 1968, Major (later General) Jerome F. O'Malley and Major Edward D. Payne flew the first operational SR-71 sortie in SR-71 serial number 61-7976 from Kadena AFB, Okinawa. During its career, this aircraft (976) accumulated 2,981 flying hours and flew 942 total sorties (more than any other SR-71), including 257 operational missions, from Beale AFB; Palmdale, California; Kadena Air Base, Okinawa, Japan; and RAF Mildenhall, UK. The aircraft was flown to the National Museum of the United States Air Force near Dayton, Ohio in March 1990.

The USAF could fly each SR-71, on average, once per week, because of the extended turnaround required after mission recovery.  Very often an aircraft would return with rivets missing, delaminated panels or other broken parts such as inlets requiring repair or replacement. There were cases of the aircraft not being ready to fly again for a month due to the repairs needed. Rob Vermeland, Lockheed Martin's manager of Advanced Development Program, said in an interview in 2015 that high-tempo operations were not realistic for the SR-71. "If we had one sitting in the hangar here and the crew chief was told there was a mission planned right now, then 19 hours later it would be safely ready to take off."

From the beginning of the Blackbird's reconnaissance missions over North Vietnam and Laos in 1968, the SR-71s averaged approximately one sortie a week for nearly two years. By 1970, the SR-71s were averaging two sorties per week, and by 1972, they were flying nearly one sortie every day. Two SR-71s were lost during these missions, one in 1970 and the second aircraft in 1972, both due to mechanical malfunctions. Over the course of its reconnaissance missions during the Vietnam War, the North Vietnamese fired approximately 800 SAMs at SR-71s, none of which managed to score a hit.

While deployed at Okinawa, the SR-71s and their aircrew members gained the nickname Habu (as did the A-12s preceding them) after a pit viper indigenous to Japan, which the Okinawans thought the plane resembled.

Operational highlights for the entire Blackbird family (YF-12, A-12, and SR-71) as of about 1990 included:
3,551 mission sorties flown
17,300 total sorties flown
11,008 mission flight hours
53,490 total flight hours
2,752 hours Mach 3 time (missions)
11,675 hours Mach 3 time (total)

Only one crew member, Jim Zwayer, a Lockheed flight-test reconnaissance and navigation systems specialist, was killed in a flight accident. The rest of the crew members ejected safely or evacuated their aircraft on the ground.

An SR-71 was used domestically in 1971 to assist the FBI in their manhunt for the skyjacker D.B. Cooper. The Blackbird was to retrace and photograph the flightpath of the hijacked 727 from Seattle to Reno and attempt to locate any of items that Cooper was known to have parachuted with from the aircraft. Five flights were attempted but on each occasion no photographs of the flight path were obtained due to low visibility.

European flights 
European operations were from RAF Mildenhall, England. There were two routes. One was along the Norwegian west coast and up the Kola Peninsula, which contained several large naval bases belonging to the Soviet Navy's Northern Fleet. Over the years, there were several emergency landings in Norway, four in Bodø and two of them in 1981 (flying from Beale) and 1985. Rescue parties were sent in to repair the planes before leaving. On one occasion, one complete wing with engine was replaced as the easiest way to get the plane airborne again. The other route, from Mildenhall over the Baltic Sea, was known as the Baltic Express.

Swedish Air Force fighter pilots have managed to lock their radar on an SR-71 on multiple occasions within shooting range. Target illumination was maintained by feeding target location from ground-based radars to the fire-control computer in the JA 37 Viggen interceptor. The most common site for the lock-on was the thin stretch of international airspace between Öland and Gotland that the SR-71s used on their return flights.

On 29 June 1987, an SR-71 was on a mission around the Baltic Sea to spy on Soviet postings when one of the engines exploded. The aircraft, which was at 20 km altitude, quickly lost altitude and turned 180° to the left and turned over Gotland to search for the Swedish coast. Thus, Swedish airspace was violated, whereupon two unarmed Saab JA 37 Viggens on an exercise at the height of Västervik were ordered there. The mission was to do an incident preparedness check and identify an aircraft of high interest. It was found that the plane was in obvious distress and a decision was made that the Swedish Air Force would escort the plane out of the Baltic Sea. A second round of armed JA-37s from Ängelholm replaced the first pair and completed the escort to Danish airspace. The event had been classified for over 30 years, and when the report was unsealed, data from the NSA showed that multiple MiG-25s with the order to shoot down the SR-71 or force it to land, had started right after the engine failure. A MiG-25 had locked a missile on the damaged SR-71, but as the aircraft was under escort, no missiles were fired. On 29 November 2018, the four Swedish pilots involved were awarded medals from the USAF.

Initial retirement
One widely conventional view, and probably the best-known view, of the reasons for the SR-71's retirement in 1989—a view that the Air Force itself offered to the Congress—was that besides being very expensive, the SR-71 had become redundant anyway, among other reconnaissance methods that were ever-evolving. However, another view held by various officers and legislators is that the SR-71 program was terminated owing to Pentagon politics, and not because the aircraft had become obsolete, irrelevant, too hard to maintain, or unsustainably expensive. Graham, a former 1st-SRS and 9th-SRW commander, presented in 1996 what he viewed as a factual summary, not an opinion, of how the SR-71 provided some intelligence capabilities that none of its alternatives (such as satellites, U-2s, and UAVs) were providing in the 1990s (when the SR-71 was retired and then re-retired from Air Force reconnaissance duty.) The chief question for opinion, beyond that point, was only how crucial, or disposable, those unique advantages properly were. 

Graham noted that in the 1970s and early 1980s, SR-71 squadron and wing commanders were often promoted into higher positions as general officers within the USAF structure and the Pentagon. (In order to be selected into the SR-71 program in the first place, a pilot or navigator (RSO) had to be a top-quality USAF officer, so continuing career progression for members of this elite group was not surprising.) These generals were adept at communicating the value of the SR-71 to a USAF command staff and a Congress who often lacked a basic understanding of how the SR-71 worked and what it did. However, by the mid-1980s, these SR-71 generals all had retired, and a new generation of USAF generals mostly wanted to cut the program's budget and spend its funding on different priorities, such as the very expensive new B-2 Spirit strategic bomber program. Such generals had an interest in believing, and persuading the services and the Congress, that the SR-71 had become either entirely or almost entirely redundant to satellites, U-2s, incipient UAV programs, and an alleged top-secret successor already under development. Graham said that the last-mentioned one was only a sales pitch, not a fact, at the time in the 1990s.

The USAF may have seen the SR-71 as a bargaining chip to ensure the survival of other priorities. Also, the SR-71 program's "product", which was operational and strategic intelligence, was not seen by these generals as being very valuable to the USAF. The primary consumers of this intelligence were the CIA, NSA, and DIA. A general misunderstanding of the nature of aerial reconnaissance and a lack of knowledge about the SR-71 in particular (due to its secretive development and operations) was used by detractors to discredit the aircraft, with the assurance given that a replacement was under development. Dick Cheney told the Senate Appropriations Committee that the SR-71 cost $85,000 per hour to operate. Opponents estimated the aircraft's support cost at $400 to $700 million per year, though the cost was actually closer to $300 million.

The SR-71, while much more capable than the Lockheed U-2 in terms of range, speed, and survivability, suffered the lack of a data link, which the U-2 had been upgraded to carry. This meant that much of the SR-71's imagery and radar data could not be used in real time, but had to wait until the aircraft returned to base. This lack of immediate real-time capability was used as one of the justifications to close down the program. The counterargument was that the longer the SR-71 was not upgraded as aggressively as it ought to have been, the more people could say that it was obsolescent, which was in their interest as champions of other programs (a self-fulfilling bias). Attempts to add a datalink to the SR-71 were stymied early on by the same factions in the Pentagon and Congress who were already set on the program's demise, even in the early 1980s. These same factions also forced expensive sensor upgrades to the SR-71, which did little to increase its mission capabilities, but could be used as justification for complaining about the cost of the program.

In 1988, Congress was convinced to allocate $160,000 to keep six SR-71s and a trainer model in flyable storage that could become flightworthy within 60 days. However, the USAF refused to spend the money. While the SR-71 survived attempts to retire it in 1988, partly due to the unmatched ability to provide high-quality coverage of the Kola Peninsula for the US Navy, the decision to retire the SR-71 from active duty came in 1989, with the last missions flown in October that year. Four months after the plane's retirement, General Norman Schwarzkopf Jr., was told that the expedited reconnaissance, which the SR-71 could have provided, was unavailable during Operation Desert Storm.

The SR-71 program's main operational capabilities came to a close at the end of fiscal year 1989 (October 1989). The 1st Strategic Reconnaissance Squadron (1 SRS) kept its pilots and aircraft operational and active, and flew some operational reconnaissance missions through the end of 1989 and into 1990, due to uncertainty over the timing of the final termination of funding for the program. The squadron finally closed in mid-1990, and the aircraft were distributed to static display locations, with a number kept in reserve storage.

Reactivation

Due to unease over political situations in the Middle East and North Korea, the U.S. Congress re-examined the SR-71 beginning in 1993. Rear Admiral Thomas F. Hall addressed the question of why the SR-71 was retired, saying it was under "the belief that, given the time delay associated with mounting a mission, conducting a reconnaissance, retrieving the data, processing it, and getting it out to a field commander, that you had a problem in timelines that was not going to meet the tactical requirements on the modern battlefield. And the determination was that if one could take advantage of technology and develop a system that could get that data back real time... that would be able to meet the unique requirements of the tactical commander." Hall also stated they were "looking at alternative means of doing [the job of the SR-71]."

Macke told the committee that they were "flying U-2s, RC-135s, [and] other strategic and tactical assets" to collect information in some areas. Senator Robert Byrd and other senators complained that the "better than" successor to the SR-71 had yet to be developed at the cost of the "good enough" serviceable aircraft. They maintained that, in a time of constrained military budgets, designing, building, and testing an aircraft with the same capabilities as the SR-71 would be impossible.

Congress's disappointment with the lack of a suitable replacement for the Blackbird was cited concerning whether to continue funding imaging sensors on the U-2. Congressional conferees stated the "experience with the SR-71 serves as a reminder of the pitfalls of failing to keep existing systems up-to-date and capable in the hope of acquiring other capabilities." It was agreed to add $100 million to the budget to return three SR-71s to service, but it was emphasized that this "would not prejudice support for long-endurance UAVs" [such as the Global Hawk]. The funding was later cut to $72.5 million. The Skunk Works was able to return the aircraft to service under budget at $72 million.

Retired USAF Colonel Jay Murphy was made the Program Manager for Lockheed's reactivation plans. Retired USAF Colonels Don Emmons and Barry MacKean were put under government contract to remake the plane's logistic and support structure. Still-active USAF pilots and Reconnaissance Systems Officers (RSOs) who had worked with the aircraft were asked to volunteer to fly the reactivated planes. The aircraft was under the command and control of the 9th Reconnaissance Wing at Beale Air Force Base and flew out of a renovated hangar at Edwards Air Force Base. Modifications were made to provide a data-link with "near real-time" transmission of the Advanced Synthetic Aperture Radar's imagery to sites on the ground.

Final retirement
The reactivation met much resistance: the USAF had not budgeted for the aircraft, and UAV developers worried that their programs would suffer if money was shifted to support the SR-71s. Also, with the allocation requiring yearly reaffirmation by Congress, long-term planning for the SR-71 was difficult. In 1996, the USAF claimed that specific funding had not been authorized, and moved to ground the program. Congress reauthorized the funds, but, in October 1997, President Bill Clinton attempted to use the line-item veto to cancel the $39 million allocated for the SR-71. In June 1998, the U.S. Supreme Court ruled that the line-item veto was unconstitutional. All this left the SR-71's status uncertain until September 1998, when the USAF called for the funds to be redistributed; the USAF permanently retired it in 1998.

NASA operated the two last airworthy Blackbirds until 1999. All other Blackbirds have been moved to museums except for the two SR-71s and a few D-21 drones retained by the NASA Dryden Flight Research Center (later renamed the Armstrong Flight Research Center).

Timeline

1950s–1960s
 24 December 1957: First J58 engine run
 1 May 1960: Francis Gary Powers is shot down in a Lockheed U-2 over the Soviet Union
 13 June 1962: SR-71 mock-up reviewed by the USAF
 30 July 1962: J58 completes pre-flight testing
 28 December 1962: Lockheed signs contract to build six SR-71 aircraft
 25 July 1964: President Johnson makes public announcement of SR-71
 29 October 1964: SR-71 prototype (AF Ser. No. 61-7950) delivered to Air Force Plant 42 at Palmdale, California
 7 December 1964: Beale AFB, CA, announced as base for SR-71
 22 December 1964: First flight of the SR-71, with Lockheed test pilot Robert J "Bob" Gilliland at Palmdale
 21 July 1967: Jim Watkins and Dave Dempster fly first international sortie in SR-71A, AF Ser. No. 61-7972, when the Astro-Inertial Navigation System (ANS) fails on a training mission and they accidentally fly into Mexican airspace
 5 February 1968: Lockheed ordered to destroy A-12, YF-12, and SR-71 tooling
 8 March 1968: First SR-71A (AF Ser. No. 61-7978) arrives at Kadena AB, Okinawa to replace A-12s
 21 March 1968: First SR-71 (AF Ser. No. 61-7976) operational mission flown from Kadena AB over Vietnam
 29 May 1968: CMSgt Bill Gornik begins the tie-cutting tradition of Habu crews' neckties
 13 December 1969: Two SR-71s deployed to Taiwan.

1970s–1980s
 3 December 1975: First flight of SR-71A (AF Ser. No. 61-7959) in "big tail" configuration
 20 April 1976: TDY operations started at RAF Mildenhall, United Kingdom with SR-71A, AF Ser. No. 61-7972
 27–28 July 1976: SR-71A sets speed and altitude records (altitude in horizontal flight:  and speed over a straight course)
 August 1980: Honeywell starts conversion of AFICS to DAFICS
 15 January 1982: SR-71B, AF Ser. No. 61-7956, flies its 1,000th sortie
 21 April 1989: SR-71, AF Ser. No. 61-7974, is lost due to an engine explosion after taking off from Kadena AB, the last Blackbird to be lost
 22 November 1989: USAF SR-71 program officially terminated

1990s
 6 March 1990: Last SR-71 flight under Senior Crown program, setting four speed records en route to the Smithsonian Institution
 25 July 1991: SR-71B, AF Ser. No. 61-7956/NASA No. 831 officially delivered to NASA Dryden Flight Research Center at Edwards AFB, California
 October 1991: NASA engineer Marta Bohn-Meyer becomes the first female SR-71 crew member
 28 September 1994: Congress votes to allocate $100 million for reactivation of three SR-71s
 28 June 1995: First reactivated SR-71 returns to USAF as Detachment 2
 9 October 1999: The last flight of the SR-71 (AF Ser. No. 61-7980/NASA 844)

Records

The SR-71 was the world's fastest and highest-flying air-breathing operational manned aircraft throughout its career and it still holds that record. Several aircraft have exceeded this altitude in zoom climbs, but not in sustained flight. SR-71 pilot Brian Shul states in his book The Untouchables that he flew in excess of Mach 3.5 on 15 April 1986 over Libya to evade a missile.

This equates to an average speed of about Mach 2.72, including deceleration for in-flight refueling. Peak speeds during this flight were likely closer to the declassified top speed of over Mach 3.2. For comparison, the best commercial Concorde flight time was 2 hours 52 minutes and the Boeing 747 averages 6 hours 15 minutes.

This flight was awarded the 1971 Mackay Trophy for the "most meritorious flight of the year" and the 1972 Harmon Trophy for "most outstanding international achievement in the art/science of aeronautics".

When the SR-71 was retired in 1990, one Blackbird was flown from its birthplace at USAF Plant 42 in Palmdale, California, to go on exhibit at what is now the Smithsonian Institution's Steven F. Udvar-Hazy Center in Chantilly, Virginia. On 6 March 1990, Lt. Col. Raymond E.  and Lt. Col. Joseph T. Vida piloted SR-71 S/N 61-7972 on its final Senior Crown flight and set four new speed records in the process:
Los Angeles, California, to Washington, D.C., distance , average speed , and an elapsed time of 64 minutes 20 seconds.
West Coast to East Coast, distance , average speed , and an elapsed time of 67 minutes 54 seconds.
Kansas City, Missouri, to Washington, D.C., distance , average speed , and an elapsed time of 25 minutes 59 seconds.
St. Louis, Missouri, to Cincinnati, Ohio, distance , average speed , and an elapsed time of 8 minutes 32 seconds.

These four speed records were accepted by the National Aeronautic Association (NAA), the recognized body for aviation records in the United States. Additionally, Air & Space/Smithsonian reported that the USAF clocked the SR-71 at one point in its flight reaching . After the Los Angeles–Washington flight, on 6 March 1990, Senator John Glenn addressed the United States Senate, chastising the Department of Defense for not using the SR-71 to its full potential:

Successor

Speculation existed regarding a replacement for the SR-71, including a rumored aircraft codenamed Aurora. The limitations of reconnaissance satellites, which take up to 24 hours to arrive in the proper orbit to photograph a particular target, make them slower to respond to demand than reconnaissance planes. The fly-over orbit of spy satellites may also be predicted and can allow assets to be hidden when the satellite passes, a drawback not shared by aircraft. Thus, there are doubts that the US has abandoned the concept of spy planes to complement reconnaissance satellites. Unmanned aerial vehicles (UAVs) are also used for aerial reconnaissance in the 21st century, being able to overfly hostile territory without putting human pilots at risk, as well as being smaller and harder to detect than manned aircraft.

On 1 November 2013, media outlets reported that Skunk Works has been working on an unmanned reconnaissance airplane it has named SR-72, which would fly twice as fast as the SR-71, at Mach 6. However, the USAF is officially pursuing the Northrop Grumman RQ-180 UAV to assume the SR-71's strategic ISR role.

Variants

 SR-71A was the main production variant.
 SR-71B was a trainer variant.
 SR-71C was a hybrid trainer aircraft composed of the rear fuselage of the first YF-12A (S/N 60-6934) and the forward fuselage from an SR-71 static test unit. The YF-12 had been wrecked in a 1966 landing accident. It has been reported as that this Blackbird was seemingly not quite straight and had a yaw at supersonic speeds. However, this was caused by a mis-aligned pitot tube reporting a 4° yaw that was not actually present. It was soon corrected and then flew normally. It was nicknamed "The Bastard".

Operators

United States Air Force
Air Force Systems Command
Air Force Flight Test Center – Edwards AFB, California
4786th Test Squadron 1965–1970
SR-71 Flight Test Group 1970–1990
Strategic Air Command
9th Strategic Reconnaissance Wing – Beale AFB, California
1st Strategic Reconnaissance Squadron 1966–1990
99th Strategic Reconnaissance Squadron 1966–1971
Detachment 1, Kadena Air Base, Japan 1968–1990
Detachment 4, RAF Mildenhall. England 1976–1990
Air Combat Command
Detachment 2, 9th Reconnaissance Wing – Edwards AFB, California 1995–1997
(Forward Operating Locations at Eielson AFB, Alaska; Griffis AFB, New York; Seymour-Johnson AFB, North Carolina; Diego Garcia and Bodo, Norway 1973–1990)

National Aeronautics and Space Administration (NASA)
Dryden Flight Research Center – Edwards AFB, California 1991–1999

Accidents and aircraft disposition

Twelve SR-71s were lost and one pilot died in accidents during the aircraft's service career. Eleven of these accidents happened between 1966 and 1972.

Some secondary references use incorrect 64- series aircraft serial numbers (e.g. SR-71C 64-17981)

After completion of all USAF and NASA SR-71 operations at Edwards AFB, the SR-71 Flight Simulator was moved in July 2006 to the Frontiers of Flight Museum at Love Field Airport in Dallas, Texas.

Specifications (SR-71A)

See also

References

Footnotes

Citations

Bibliography

 "A Bittersweet and Fancy Flight." Philadelphia Inquirer, 7 March 1990, p. 1.
 Crickmore, Paul F. "Blackbirds in the Cold War". Air International, January 2009, pp. 30–38. Stamford, UK: Key Publishing.
 Crickmore, Paul F. "Lockheed's Blackbirds – A-12, YF-12 and SR-71A". Wings of Fame, Volume 8, 1997, pp. 30–93. London: Aerospace Publishing. .
 Donald, David, ed. "Lockheed's Blackbirds: A-12, YF-12 and SR-71". Black Jets. AIRtime, 2003. .
 Goodall, James. Lockheed's SR-71 "Blackbird" Family. Hinckley, UK: Aerofax/Midland Publishing, 2003. .
 Graham, Richard H. SR-71 Blackbird: Stories, Tales, and Legends. North Branch, Minnesota: Zenith Imprint, 2002. .
 Graham, Richard H. SR-71 Revealed: The Inside Story. St. Paul, Minnesota: MBI Publishing Company, 1996. .
 Graham, Richard H. SR-71: The Complete Illustrated History of the Blackbird, The World's Highest, Fastest Plane 2013. .
 Jenkins, Dennis R. Lockheed Secret Projects: Inside the Skunk Works. St. Paul, Minnesota: MBI Publishing Company, 2001. .
 Johnson, C.L. Kelly: More Than My Share of it All. Washington, DC: Smithsonian Books, 1985. .
 Landis, Tony R. and Dennis R. Jenkins. Lockheed Blackbirds. Minneapolis, Minnesota: Specialty Press, revised edition, 2005. .
 McIninch, Thomas. "The Oxcart Story". Center for the Study of Intelligence, Central Intelligence Agency, 2 July 1996. Retrieved: 10 April 2009.
 Merlin, Peter W. From Archangel to Senior Crown: Design and Development of the Blackbird., Reston, Virginia: American Institute of Aeronautics and Astronautics (AIAA), 2008. .
 Merlin, Peter W. "The Truth is Out There... SR-71 Serials and Designations". Air Enthusiast, No. 118, July/August 2005. Stamford, UK: Key Publishing, pp. 2–6. ISSN 0143-5450.
 Pace, Steve. Lockheed SR-71 Blackbird. Swindon, UK: Crowood Press, 2004. .
 Remak, Jeannette and Joe Ventolo Jr. A-12 Blackbird Declassified. St. Paul, Minnesota: MBI Publishing Company, 2001. .
 Rich, Ben R. and Leo Janos. Skunk Works: A Personal Memoir of My Years at Lockheed. New York: Little, Brown and Company, 1994. .
 Shul, Brian and Sheila Kathleen O'Grady. Sled Driver: Flying the World's Fastest Jet. Marysville, California: Gallery One, 1994. .
 Shul, Brian and Walter Watson Jr. The Untouchables. Chico, California: Mach 1, Inc. 1993. .
 Suhler, Paul A. From RAINBOW to GUSTO: Stealth and the Design of the Lockheed Blackbird (Library of Flight Series) . Reston, Virginia: American Institute of Aeronautics and Astronautics (AIAA), 2009. .

Additional sources

 Brandt, Steven A., Randall J. Stiles and John J. Bertin. Introduction to Aeronautics: A Design Perspective. Reston, Virginia: American Institute of Aeronautics & Astronautics, 2004, pp. 141–150. .
 Brown, Kevin V. "America's SuperSecret Spy Plane." Popular Mechanics, June 1968, pp. 59–62, 190.
 Clarkson, Jeremy. I Know You Got Soul. London: Penguin Books Limited, 2006. .
 Crickmore, Paul F. Lockheed Blackbird: Beyond the Secret Missions. Oxford, UK: Osprey Publishing, 2004. .
 Crickmore, Paul and Jim Laurier. Lockheed SR-71 Operations in the Far East. Oxford, UK: Osprey Publishing, 2008. .
 Darwall, Bjarne. Luftens Dirigenter (Air Conductors) (in Swedish). Nässjö, Sweden: Air Historic Research AB, 2004. .
 Goodall, James and Jay Miller. "Lockheed's SR-71 'Blackbird' Family A-12, F-12, M-21, D-21, SR-71". Hinckley, UK: AeroFax-Midland Publishing, 2002. .
 Grant, R.G. Flight: 100 Years of Aviation. New York: DK Publishing, 2007. .
 Hobson, Chris. Vietnam Air Losses, USAF, USN, USMC, Fixed-Wing Aircraft Losses in Southeast Asia 1961–1973. North Branch, Minnesota: Specialty Press, 2001. .
 Merlin, Peter W. Design and Development of the Blackbird: Challenges and Lessons Learned. Orlando, Florida: American Institute of Aeronautics and Astronautics (AIAA), 2009. AIAA 2009-1522.
 Merlin, Peter W. Mach 3+: NASA USAF YF-12 Flight Research 1969–1979. Washington, D.C.: Diane Publishing Co., NASA History Division Office, 2002. .
 Pappas, Terry. "The Blackbird is Back." Popular Mechanics, June 1991, pp. 27–31, 104–105.
 Sr-71 Blackbird Pilot's Flight Manual.
 Reithmaier, Lawrence W. Mach 1 and Beyond. New York: McGraw-Hill, 1994, pp. 220–237. .

External links

 
 
 
 
 

SR-071
1960s United States military reconnaissance aircraft
Twinjets
Tailless delta-wing aircraft
NASA aircraft
Signals intelligence
Aircraft first flown in 1964
Stealth aircraft
Supersonic aircraft
High-altitude and long endurance aircraft
Strategic reconnaissance aircraft
Aircraft related to spaceflight